Man and His Woman is a 1920 American silent drama film directed by J. Stuart Blackton and starring Herbert Rawlinson, Eulalie Jensen and May McAvoy.

Cast
 Herbert Rawlinson as Dr. John Worthing
 Eulalie Jensen as Claire Eaton
 May McAvoy as 	Eve Cartier
 Warren Chandler as 	Hugh Conway
 Louis Dean as 	Dr. Elliot
 Charles Kent as The Stranger

References

Bibliography
 Connelly, Robert B. The Silents: Silent Feature Films, 1910-36, Volume 40, Issue 2. December Press, 1998.

External links
 

1920s American films
1920 films
1920 drama films
1920s English-language films
American silent feature films
Silent American drama films
American black-and-white films
Films directed by J. Stuart Blackton
Pathé Exchange films